Thunderball (Eliot Franklin) is a fictional character, a supervillain appearing in American comic books published by Marvel Comics. He is a frequent enemy of Thor and a reluctant ally of the Wrecker and the Wrecking Crew.

The character made his live-action debut in the Marvel Cinematic Universe television series She-Hulk: Attorney at Law, played by Justin Eaton.

Publication history
Thunderball was created by Len Wein and Sal Buscema and first appeared in The Defenders #17 (November 1974).

Phillip Lamarr Cunningham identifies how black supervillains are often forced to choose between great power and great intellect: "Thunderball, who despite his genius-level intellect relies primarily on his strength, has resorted to utilizing a ball and chain as a weapon, and commits crimes with his band of ruffians, The Wrecking Crew."

Fictional character biography
Dr. Eliot Franklin was born in Buffalo, New York. He became a brilliant physicist and engineer, inventing a miniature gamma-ray bomb, a feat that Dr. Robert Bruce Banner (better known as the Hulk) was unable to do at that time. Dr. Franklin was often called "the Black Bruce Banner" because of his genius-level intellect and his scientific knowledge in the field of gamma radiation. Franklin used his scientific genius in private employ and built a miniaturized gamma bomb for Richmond Enterprises. However, Richmond executive J. C. Pennysworth used a loophole in the contract to steal the gamma bomb intellectual property. Franklin threw a fit and was fired. He later attempted to steal back his plans for the gamma bomb, but was caught and imprisoned. In prison he met Dirk Garthwaite (aka the Wrecker, who was de-powered at that time), Henry Camp, and Brian Philip Calusky.

One night during a thunderstorm, Garthwaite broke out of prison, along with his cellmates Henry Camp, Brian Philip Calusky, and Dr. Eliot Franklin. He recovered his magical crowbar and held it aloft, all four men placing their hands upon it. Lightning struck the crowbar, not only reactivating the enchantment but also empowering the other three men as well. The four felons dubbed themselves the Wrecking Crew; Camp became Bulldozer, Calusky became Piledriver, and Franklin became Thunderball. Soon after, Thunderball took an ordinary wrecking ball for an offensive weapon which was energized by the Wrecker's crowbar, making it almost indestructible.

Thunderball then convinced his allies that they should capture the gamma bomb he had created and use it to ransom New York. They began to tear apart buildings owned by Richmond Enterprises to find the bomb, attracting the attention of the Defenders, including Nighthawk (Kyle Richmond himself). The Crew was defeated by the Defenders and dispersed to different prisons.

Thunderball later battled Captain America and Iron Fist alongside the Wrecking Crew while trying to lure Thor into battle. Thunderball later battled Thor alongside the Wrecking Crew. He also battled the second Iron Man, James Rhodes. Thunderball was later taken to the Beyonder's Battleworld during the Secret Wars with the rest of the Wrecking Crew and various other criminals, where they were part of Doctor Doom's evil alliance, and battled heroes such as the Avengers, the X-Men, and the Fantastic Four.

The relationship between the Wrecker and Thunderball has always been somewhat strained at times. Dr. Franklin believes that he is superior to the Wrecker because he is smarter than the Wrecker is, thus causing him to be resentful that the source and total reliance of his power lies with the Wrecker. Thunderball has attempted to usurp the Wrecker's power many times, only to be eventually thwarted. Once, the Wrecker easily crushed Thunderball's hand after he tried to steal his crowbar. However, the Wrecker has always taken Thunderball back, because he considers Thunderball and the rest of the Wrecking Crew as the only family he truly has. On one occasion, the Wrecking Crew battled Spider-Man and Spider-Woman while attempting to acquire the means to blackmail the federal government. Thunderball and the Wrecker fought for control over the Norn power, and Thunderball succeeded in stealing the crowbar and added it to his own powers, but he was defeated by Spider-Man and Spider-Woman.

As a member of the Wrecking Crew, Thunderball has faced many of Marvel's superheroes, including Thor, Iron Man, the Avengers, and the Hulk. They have also been part of other "Super Villain" organizations, but they always stayed together as a team.  Thunderball has occasionally operated on his own, working as a scientist for criminal organizations.

Thunderball joined the Masters of Evil alongside the rest of the Wrecking Crew, and took over Avengers Mansion. As part of this "Siege of Avengers Mansion", the Wrecking Crew, along with other Masters as Tiger Shark and Mister Hyde, beat a drunken Olympian demigod Hercules nearly to death. However, they were drained of their power by Thor in retaliation. Thunderball was later protected from the Wrecker's vengeance by the Thing.

Thunderball developed something of a soft spot for the employees of Damage Control, particularly account executive John Porter, after the firm helped him recover his lost wrecking ball (the weapon had been turned in to Damage Control's Lost and Found department). During a massive supervillain breakout at the prison called the Vault, the Wrecking Crew met up with a team from Damage Control led by Porter. To aid Porter without appearing to betray the Crew, Thunderball tricked his teammates into thinking John has superpowers (really, Thunderball hitting the Crew when the lights are out) and the Damage Control team manages to escape. The Wrecking Crew battled the Avengers and Freedom Force during the breakout, and Thunderball battled Venom for leadership of the convicts. Ultimately, Thunderball helped Iron Man and Dr. Hank Pym disarm a bomb that would have destroyed the Vault.

The Wrecking Crew were broken out of prison and used by a group of villains during the Acts of Vengeance storyline. Thunderball was sent by Doctor Doom to help a group of villains assembled to defeat the Fantastic Four, although the villains were all defeated. With the Wrecking Crew, Thunderball freed the Wrecker and Ulik from police custody. They battled Hercules and Thor and then battled Thor, Excalibur and Code: Blue. Thunderball was freed from police custody by Jeff Wilde. Thunderball joined forces with the Secret Empire, creating many of the weapons systems that would be used to turn Jeff Wilde, son of the original Midnight Man, into the cyborg warrior known as Midnight. In a battle with the Empire against Spider-Man, the Moon Knight, and their allies Darkhawk, the Punisher, Nova, and Night Thrasher, Thunderball was one of the few Empire operatives to survive the destruction of the organization's base. He surrendered to the assembled heroes soon after.

The Wrecking Crew with Thunderball once conquered an entire planet together, Polemachus, which was the home of sometime Avenger ally/adversary Arkon. They overthrew Arkon and his consort, Thundra, and ruled Polemachus with the help of Arkon's former Grand Vizier, who betrayed them. This was after they briefly lost their Asgardian powers (when Loki took the power originally meant for him from the Wrecker) and obtained their powers from a totally different energy source. Part of that energy source was Monica Rambeau herself, also known as the Avenger Pulsar (at the time, her codename was Photon).

During a battle in London, Thunderball tries to kill a wounded Captain America. Kelsey Leigh saves him using the shield, but dies due to the shock of the impacts. Kelsey later returns as a new Captain Britain and seemingly kills Thunderball, but he survives. It is, however, revealed that this Thunderball is either Mordred, the ally of Morgana le Fay, or Franklin possessed by him.

Later, the Wrecking Crew breaks into a bank in Los Angeles, where they are confronted by the Runaways, who defeat them. Thunderball gets chewed on by one of the team, Old Lace, a dinosaur from the future.

Thunderball and the rest of the Wrecking Crew are forced into governmental service under the Thunderbolts program.

The Wrecking Crew with Thunderball have since been spotted in Canada fighting the newly created Omega Flight.

The Hood hired Thunderball and the rest of the Wrecking Crew as part of his criminal organization to take advantage of the split in the superhero community caused by the Superhuman Registration Act. He helps them fight the New Avengers, but is taken down by Doctor Strange.

Thunderball was later seen with the Hood watching the Skrull invasion on TV, helping to ferret out Skrull infiltrators from their own ranks  and assisting in the Hood/hero alliance battle against invading Skrulls in Central Park. He joins with the Hood's gang in an attack on the New Avengers, who were expecting the Dark Avengers instead.

During the Siege storyline, Thunderball rebelled against his teammates' attitude, stating that looting Asgard was blasphemy. He was knocked out by the rest of the Wrecking Crew before they were eventually defeated by the Young Avengers.

Following the Death of Wolverine storyline in the pages of Wolverine, the Wrecking Crew hired out to Mister Sinister to recover the remains of Wolverine and encountered Mystique's team.

As part of the All-New, All-Different Marvel event, Thunderball appears as a member of the Hood's incarnation of the Illuminati. Titania asks about the rest of the Wrecking Crew and he replies "I ditched 'em. I needed a change, and the Hood offered it."

During the "Search for Tony Stark" story arc, Thunderball and the rest of the Wrecking Crew rejoin the Hood's gang as they attack Castle Doom. Thunderball and the Wrecker are defeated by Doctor Doom in his Iron Man armor.

Powers and abilities
Thunderball possesses superhuman strength and a high degree of imperviousness to harm thanks to the Asgardian magic imparted by the Wrecker's crowbar. He can withstand high amounts of concussive force and is virtually bulletproof. Thunderball's power augmented his entire body, strengthening his bones, muscles and flesh. His superhuman abilities are currently four times greater than when he originally shared the Wrecker's power, making him somewhat stronger than an average well-trained Asgardian God.

Thunderball possesses a virtually indestructible wrecking ball attached to a  chain, enchanted by the Wrecker's crowbar. The wrecking ball, when thrown, is capable of returning to Thunderball in a similar fashion as the Wrecker's crowbar and Thor's hammer. With effort, Thunderball can even control the path it takes on its return. Thunderball can spin the wrecking ball on its chain fast enough to deflect bullets and automatic gunfire. By slamming the wrecking ball on the ground, Thunderball can cause minor localized quakes, knocking his opponents off-balance. The wrecking ball is also durable enough to be thrown into vehicles, buildings, and other structures, knocking them down with no damage to itself. In the past, the Hulk and Hercules have both destroyed the wrecking ball. When this happens, Thunderball does not suffer any ill psychic effects from the wrecking ball's destruction. He can recreate the weapon by obtaining a new wrecking ball and having the Wrecker enchant it for him.

In addition, Thunderball is highly intelligent. He is a scientific genius in the field of engineering and physics, specializing in gamma radiation. He is a gifted physicist with a Ph.D. in physics as well as an experienced planner and tactician. On at least one occasion when he did not have access to the Wrecker's crowbar, he used his own engineering abilities to create an energized exoskeleton of power armor that simulated the abilities of the wrecking ball, albeit on a lesser scale.  The exoskeleton also gave Franklin the ability to shock foes on physical contact. He also engineered an energized wrecking ball capable of projecting electrical energy bolts.

Other versions

House of M: Masters of Evil
Thunderball (along with the rest of the Wrecking Crew) appears as a member of the Hood's Masters of Evil. Before the Red Guard attacks Santo Rico, Thunderball leaves the team alongside the Cobra, Mister Hyde and Crossbones.

Marvel Zombies
At the beginning of Marvel Zombies vs. The Army of Darkness, Ash Williams accidentally allows Thunderball to defeat Daredevil in combat. Thunderball thanks Ash for defeating Daredevil in the process by shaking his hand.  He is seen later by Ash and Frank Castle in the middle of a zombie riot on a New York street with tears running down his eyes as he tries to ward off the impending zombie hordes from overpowering him. Despite Ash's vocal concerns, Thunderball is gunned down by Frank for his past as a criminal shortly before Frank is overpowered and killed by the zombie masses.

Ultimate Marvel
Ultimate Thunderball appears in Ultimate Captain America Annual #1, detailing the involvement of the Black Panther. His real name is Elliot Franklin, and he is described by S.H.I.E.L.D. as a criminal who has somehow been enhanced. Captain America, under orders from Fury sends the Black Panther to stop him as a trial for his inductance into the Ultimates. He is visually still the same, a muscular African American who has a giant five-ton wrecking ball.

In other media

Television
 Thunderball appears in The Super Hero Squad Show, voiced by Alimi Ballard.
 Thunderball appears in The Avengers: Earth's Mightiest Heroes, voiced by Gary Anthony Williams.
 Thunderball appears in the Ultimate Spider-Man episode "Damage", voiced by Chi McBride.
 Thunderball appears in Avengers Assemble, voiced by Fred Tatasciore.
 Thunderball appears in Hulk and the Agents of S.M.A.S.H. episodes "The Skaar Whisperer" and "The Big Green Mile", voiced by Fred Tatasciore in the former and Jonathan Adams in the latter.
 Thunderball appears in Marvel Disk Wars: The Avengers.
 Thunderball appears in the She-Hulk: Attorney at Law episode "The People vs. Emil Blonsky", portrayed by Justin Eaton. This version wields an Asgardian flail.

Video games
 Thunderball appears as a collective boss alongside the Wrecking Crew in Marvel: Ultimate Alliance, voiced by Fred Tatasciore.
 Thunderball appears as a boss in Marvel: Avengers Alliance.

References

External links
 Thunderball at Marvel.com

Characters created by Len Wein
Characters created by Sal Buscema
Comics characters introduced in 1974
Fictional African-American people
Fictional characters with superhuman durability or invulnerability
Fictional physicists
Marvel Comics characters with superhuman strength
Marvel Comics mutates
Marvel Comics scientists
Thor (Marvel Comics)

fr:Démolisseurs#Boulet / Dr. Eliot Franklin